SMSA may refer to:

 Sydney Mechanics' School of Arts, in Sydney, NSW, Australia
 St. Mary's Springs Academy, in Milwaukee, Wisconsin, USA
 Standard Metropolitan Statistical Area
 Satrio airport (ICAO airport code: SMSA) in Suriname, see List of airports in Suriname
 Singapore Motor Sports Association, see List of FIA member organisations
 SMS-1 weather satellite, formerly SMS-A
 , formerly SMS-A